The 2017–18 Scottish League Cup group stage was played from 14 July to 30 July 2017. A total of 40 teams competed in the group stage. The winners of each of the eight groups, as well as the four best runners-up progressed to the second round (last 16) of the 2017–18 Scottish League Cup.

Format

The group stage consisted of eight teams from the 2016–17 Scottish Premiership, ten teams from each of the 2016–17 Scottish Championship, 2016–17 Scottish League One and 2016–17 Scottish League Two, as well as the winners of the 2016–17 Highland Football League and 2016–17 Lowland Football League. The 40 teams were divided into two sections: North and South; with each section containing four top seeded teams, four second seeded teams and 12 unseeded teams. Each section was drawn into four groups with each group being made up of 1 top seed, 1 second seed and 3 unseeded sides. Seedings for the draw were confirmed on 31 May 2017, two days before the draw.

The draw for the group stages took place on Friday 2 June 2017 at 6:30pm BST at the BT Sport Studio in London and was shown live on BT Sport 2.

Teams

North

Seeding
Teams in Bold qualified for the second round

South

Seeding
Teams in Bold qualified for the second round

North

Group A

Matches

Group B

Matches

Group C

Matches

Group D

Matches

South

Group E

Matches

Group F

Matches

Group G

Matches

Group H

Matches

Best runners-up

Qualified teams

Top goalscorers

There were 267 goals scored in 80 matches in the group stage, for an average of  goals per match.

References

External links
 Scottish Professional Football League – League Cup official website

Scottish League Cup group stages
2017–18 in Scottish football cups